This was the eighth season of Barnes Football Club.

Athletic Sports
 Date: 26 March 1870
 Venue: "Football Field",  belonging to J. Johnstone, White Hart Inn, Mortlake.
 Committee: W. M. Chinnery (starter), F. W. Bryant, R. W. Willis (judges), W. M. Chinnery and E. C. Morley (umpires)
 Events: 100 yards flat race, 400 yards flat race handicap, half-mile handicap, 150 yards hurdle, one mile handicap steeplechase, two miles handicap walking, high jump, high jump with pole, vaulting

Notes

Barnes F.C. seasons
Barnes